Afterimage is an original novel by Pierce Askegren based on the U.S. television series Buffy the Vampire Slayer. It is set early in the second season of the TV show.

Plot summary
Sunnydale Drive-In reopens with a dusk-to-dawn festival of classic B movies. Xander has free tickets after working there as a gopher for the construction crew, but as Buffy, Willow, and Cordelia show little interest, he ends up going with Jonathan. Jonathan, like many of the patrons of the drive-in, falls asleep during the night and cannot be re-awakened.

Meanwhile, Buffy and Angel fight off attacks from a wolf-man and a gang of chain-wielding bikers who seem solid one minute and fade into thin air the next. Other vanishing figures are seen around town, leading Giles and Willow to research ectoplasm. Xander recognizes a picture in one of Giles' old books as the man behind the re-opening of the drive-in: Mr Balsamo, otherwise known as the eighteenth-century occultist Cagliostro.

When Giles is kidnapped, Buffy, Angel and Willow head to the drive-in to confront the villain, while Xander and Cordelia stay at the hospital with his victims.

References

External links
 Whedonesque.com - Whedonesquers discuss the book before its release

Reviews
 Shadowcat.name - Review of this book
 Sfx.co.uk - Review of this book

2006 novels
Books based on Buffy the Vampire Slayer
Pocket Books books